Scourge of Malice is the third studio album by the symphonic black metal band Graveworm, released in 2001 through Last Episode.

Their cover of Iron Maiden's Fear of the Dark has been famously wrongly credited to Cradle of Filth or Children of Bodom.

Track listing
All songs written by Stefan Fiori and Steve Unterpertinger, except where noted. 
 "Dreaded Time (Intro)" – 1:48
 "Unhallowed by the Infernal One" – 5:59
 "Abandoned by Heaven" - 6:08
 "Descending into Ethereal Mist" – 6:46
 "Threnody (Instrumental)" (Dedicated to Max Maccani) – 4:30
 "Demonic Dreams" – 7:23
 "Fear of the Dark" (Iron Maiden cover) – 8:47
 "In Vengeance of Our Wrath" – 5:55
 "Ars Diaboli" (Gregorian chants) – 1:13
 "Sanctity Within Darkness" – 5:22

Personnel

Graveworm
 Stefan Fiori – Vocals
 Steve Unterpertinger – Lead-Guitar
 Sabine Mair – Keyboards
 Eric Treffel – Rhythm-Guitar
 Diddi Schraffel – Bass
 Martin Innerbichler – Drums

Guest musicians
 Laura Jungwirt – Violin
 Severin Trogbacher – Viola
 Theresia Kainzbauern – cello
 Peter Nietsche – Bass
 Moritz Polin, Erwig Pfaffenzeller, Jorg Pfaffenzeller – Gregorianic chants on "Ars Diaboli"
 Jorg Pfaffenzeller – Acoustic Guitar
 Herman Kühebacher – Scottish Warpipe

Special Guest on "Threnody" by Boban Milunovic
All music written and composed by Graveworm except "Fear of the Dark" by Steve Harris

Production
 Barbara Sitzmann, Foto Rapid – Photography
 Markus Pfeifhofer – Design and Layout (Mp3) at Newport Graphics
 Boban Milunovic – Mastering at Victor, Mixing, Recording
 Reinhard Brunner – Editing at ATS Studio

Notes

External links
[ Scourge of Malice] at Allmusic

2001 albums
Graveworm albums